

30001–30100 

|-id=004
| 30004 Mikewilliams ||  || Mike Williams (born 1952) was a lead engineer at the University of Arizona's Lunar and Planetary Laboratory. || 
|-id=005
| 30005 Stevenchen ||  || Steven Chen (born 1996), a finalist in the 2014 Intel Science Talent Search, a science competition for high school seniors, for his chemistry project. || 
|-id=007
| 30007 Johnclarke ||  || John Anthony Clarke (born 1996), a finalist in the 2014 Intel Science Talent Search, a science competition for high school seniors, for his earth and planetary science project. || 
|-id=008
| 30008 Aroncoraor ||  || Aron Coraor (born 1996), a finalist in the 2014 Intel Science Talent Search, a science competition for high school seniors, for his chemistry project. || 
|-id=012
| 30012 Sohamdaga ||  || Soham Daga (born 1996), a finalist in the 2014 Intel Science Talent Search, a science competition for high school seniors, for his behavioral and social sciences project. || 
|-id=017
| 30017 Shaundatta ||  || Shaun Datta (born 1996), a finalist in the 2014 Intel Science Talent Search, a science competition for high school seniors, for his physics project. || 
|-id=022
| 30022 Kathibaker ||  || Kathi Baker (1954–2014) was involved with administrative support for the NASA HiRISE mission to Mars, as well as supporting many faculty, staff and students at the University of Arizona's Lunar and Planetary Laboratory. Most recently, Kathi served as executive assistant to the LPL Director. || 
|-id=024
| 30024 Neildavey ||  || Neil Davey (born 1996) is a finalist in the 2014 Intel Science Talent Search, a science competition for high school seniors, for his bioengineering project. He attends the Montgomery Blair High School, Silver Spring, Maryland || 
|-id=025
| 30025 Benfreed ||  || Benjamin Freed (born 1996), a finalist in the 2014 Intel Science Talent Search, a science competition for high school seniors, for his biochemistry project. || 
|-id=027
| 30027 Anubhavguha ||  || Anubhav Guha (born 1996), a finalist in the 2014 Intel Science Talent Search, a science competition for high school seniors, for his materials science project. || 
|-id=028
| 30028 Yushihomma ||  || Yushi Homma (born 1995), a finalist in the 2014 Intel Science Talent Search, a science competition for high school seniors, for his mathematics project. || 
|-id=029
| 30029 Preetikakani ||  || Preeti Kakani (born 1996), a finalist in the 2014 Intel Science Talent Search, a science competition for high school seniors, for her medicine and health project. || 
|-id=030
| 30030 Joycekang ||  || Joyce Blossom Kang (born 1996), a finalist in the 2014 Intel Science Talent Search, a science competition for high school seniors, for her engineering project. || 
|-id=031
| 30031 Angelakong ||  || Angela Xiangyue Kong (born 1996), a finalist in the 2014 Intel Science Talent Search, a science competition for high school seniors, for her biochemistry project. || 
|-id=032
| 30032 Kuszmaul ||  || William Henry Kuszmaul (born 1996), a finalist in the 2014 Intel Science Talent Search, a science competition for high school seniors, for his mathematics project. || 
|-id=033
| 30033 Kevinlee ||  || Kevin Lee (born 1996), a finalist in the 2014 Intel Science Talent Search, a science competition for high school seniors, for his bioengineering project. || 
|-id=035
| 30035 Charlesliu ||  || Charles Xin Liu (born 1996), a finalist in the 2014 Intel Science Talent Search, a science competition for high school seniors, for his bioinformatics and genomics project. || 
|-id=036
| 30036 Eshamaiti ||  || Esha Maiti (born 1996), a finalist in the 2014 Intel Science Talent Search, a science competition for high school seniors, for her mathematics project. || 
|-id=037
| 30037 Rahulmehta ||  || Rahul Siddharth Mehta (born 1995), a finalist in the 2014 Intel Science Talent Search, a science competition for high school seniors, for his computer science project. || 
|-id=039
| 30039 Jameier ||  || Joshua Abraham Meier (born 1995), a finalist in the 2014 Intel Science Talent Search, a science competition for high school seniors, for his medicine and health project. || 
|-id=040
| 30040 Annemerrill ||  || Anne Merrill (born 1996), a finalist in the 2014 Intel Science Talent Search, a science competition for high school seniors, for her environmental science project. || 
|-id=042
| 30042 Schmude ||  || Richard Schmude (born 1958), a Professor of Astronomy at Gordon State College. || 
|-id=043
| 30043 Lisamichaels ||  || Lisa P. Michaels (born 1995), a finalist in the 2014 Intel Science Talent Search, a science competition for high school seniors, for her medicine and health project. || 
|-id=048
| 30048 Sreyasmisra ||  || Sreyas Misra (born 1996), a finalist in the 2014 Intel Science Talent Search, a science competition for high school seniors, for his bioengineering project. || 
|-id=049
| 30049 Violamocz ||  || Viola Mocz (born 1996), a finalist in the 2014 Intel Science Talent Search, a science competition for high school seniors, for her physics project. || 
|-id=050
| 30050 Emilypang ||  || Emily Pang (born 1996), a finalist in the 2014 Intel Science Talent Search, a science competition for high school seniors, for her medicine and health project. || 
|-id=051
| 30051 Jihopark ||  || Jiho Park (born 1996), a finalist in the 2014 Intel Science Talent Search, a science competition for high school seniors, for his biochemistry project. || 
|-id=053
| 30053 Ivanpaskov ||  || Ivan Spassimirov Paskov (born 1996), a finalist in the 2014 Intel Science Talent Search, a science competition for high school seniors, for his bioinformatics and genomics project. || 
|-id=054
| 30054 Pereira ||  || Brianna Pereira (born 1996), a finalist in the 2014 Intel Science Talent Search, a science competition for high school seniors, for her medicine and health project. || 
|-id=055
| 30055 Ajaysaini ||  || Ajay Saini (born 1996), a finalist in the 2014 Intel Science Talent Search, a science competition for high school seniors, for his behavioral and social sciences project. || 
|-id=057
| 30057 Sarasakowitz ||  || Sara Sakowitz (born 1996), a finalist in the 2014 Intel Science Talent Search, a science competition for high school seniors, for her biochemistry project. || 
|-id=060
| 30060 Davidseong ||  || David Seong (born 1995), a finalist in the 2014 Intel Science Talent Search, a science competition for high school seniors, for his biochemistry project. || 
|-id=061
| 30061 Vishnushankar ||  || Vishnu Shankar (born 1996) is a finalist in the 2014 Intel Science Talent Search, a science competition for high school seniors, for his biochemistry project. || 
|-id=063
| 30063 Jessicashi ||  || Jessica Shi (born 1996), a finalist in the 2014 Intel Science Talent Search, a science competition for high school seniors, for her mathematics project. || 
|-id=064
| 30064 Kaitlynshin ||  || Kaitlyn Shin (born 1996), a finalist in the 2014 Intel Science Talent Search, a science competition for high school seniors, for her space science project. || 
|-id=065
| 30065 Asrinivasan ||  || Anand Srinivasan (born 1996), a finalist in the 2014 Intel Science Talent Search, a science competition for high school seniors, for his computer science project. || 
|-id=066
| 30066 Parthakker ||  || Parth Thakker (born 1996), a finalist in the 2014 Intel Science Talent Search, a science competition for high school seniors, for his materials science project. || 
|-id=067
| 30067 Natalieng ||  || Natalie Ng (born 1996), a finalist in the 2014 Intel STS, and was awarded first place in the 2013 Intel ISEF, for her medicine and health project. || 
|-id=068
| 30068 Frankmelillo ||  || Frank Melillo (born 1958) has been the Coordinator for the Mercury Section of the Association of Lunar and Planetary Observers (ALPO) since 2001. Also in that year he received the ALPO Walter Haas Observing Award. || 
|-id=070
| 30070 Thabitpulak ||  || Thabit Pulak (born 1996), a finalist in the 2014 Intel STS, and was awarded second place in the 2013 Intel ISEF, for his environmental science project. || 
|-id=073
| 30073 Erichen ||  || Eric Shu Chen (born 1996), a finalist in the 2014 Intel STS, and was awarded first place in the 2013 Intel ISEF for his microbiology project. || 
|-id=080
| 30080 Walterworman ||  || Walter E. Worman (born 1944 ) is a professor emeritus of the Minnesota State University (Moorhead, Minnesota) whose asteroid research in the 1990s and early 2000s helped establish asteroid photometry research using small university telescopes. || 
|-id=081
| 30081 Zarinrahman ||  || Zarin Ibnat Rahman (born 1996), a finalist in the 2014 Intel STS, and was awarded best of category and first place in the 2013 Intel ISEF, for her behavioral and social sciences project. || 
|-id=085
| 30085 Kevingarbe ||  || Kevin Matthew Garbe (born 1995), a finalist in the 2013 Intel Science Talent Search, a science competition for high school seniors, for his mathematics project. || 
|-id=088
| 30088 Deprá ||  || Mário De Prá (born 1986) is a postdoctoral researcher at Florida Space Institute (Orlando, Florida) whose studies include photometry and spectroscopy of primitive asteroids to infer their composition, in particular those belonging to the outer belt dynamical groups. || 
|-id=090
| 30090 Grossano ||  || Geoffrey Louis Rossano (1949–2021), an American historian, polymath, and author of several books and many articles, who was a teacher at Salisbury School in Salisbury, Connecticut. || 
|-id=094
| 30094 Rolfebode ||  || Rolfe Bode (born 1959) is an aerospace engineer who has worked on many NASA missions including MPL-MVACS and the Phoenix Mars mission at the University of Arizona's Lunar and Planetary Laboratory and private space companies including Paragon Space Development Corp. and World View Enterprises. || 
|-id=095
| 30095 Tarabode ||  || Tara Bode (born 1975) has been the long-time business manager at the University of Arizona's Lunar and Planetary Laboratory and the Department of Planetary Sciences. She has provided vital support for numerous planetary scientists, staff, students, programs and spacecraft missions. || 
|-id=096
| 30096 Glindadavidson ||  || Glinda Davidson (born 1963) is a long-time business manager, contracts and budget expert at the University of Arizona's Lunar and Planetary Laboratory and the Department of Planetary Sciences. || 
|-id=097
| 30097 Traino ||  || Alan Traino, American astronomer and caver || 
|-id=100
| 30100 Christophergo ||  || Christopher Go (born 1970), a Philippine astrophotographer. || 
|}

30101–30200 

|-id=109
| 30109 Jaywilson ||  || Jay Wilson, a mentor of finalist in the 2014 Intel Science Talent Search (STS), a science competition for high school seniors || 
|-id=110
| 30110 Lisabreton ||  || Lisa Breton, a mentor of finalist in the 2014 Intel Science Talent Search (STS), a science competition for high school seniors || 
|-id=111
| 30111 Wendyslijk ||  || Wendy Slijk, a mentor of finalist in the 2014 Intel Science Talent Search (STS), a science competition for high school seniors || 
|-id=117
| 30117 Childress ||  || Stephanie Childress, a mentor of finalist in the 2014 Intel Science Talent Search, a science competition for high school seniors || 
|-id=119
| 30119 Lucamatone ||  || Luca Matone, a mentor of finalist in the 2014 Intel Science Talent Search (STS), a science competition for high school seniors || 
|-id=122
| 30122 Elschweitzer ||  || Ellen Schweitzer, a mentor of finalist in the 2014 Intel Science Talent Search, a science competition for high school seniors || 
|-id=123
| 30123 Scottrippeon ||  || Scott Rippeon, a mentor of finalist in the 2014 Intel Science Talent Search, a science competition for high school seniors || 
|-id=125
| 30125 Mikekiser ||  || Mike Kiser, a mentor of finalist in the 2014 Intel Science Talent Search (STS), a science competition for high school seniors || 
|-id=126
| 30126 Haviland ||  || Maureen Haviland, a mentor of finalist in the 2014 Intel Science Talent Search, a science competition for high school seniors. || 
|-id=128
| 30128 Shannonbunch ||  || Shannon Bunch, a mentor of finalist in the 2014 Intel Science Talent Search, a science competition for high school seniors || 
|-id=129
| 30129 Virmani ||  || Rajeev Virmani, a mentor of finalist in the 2014 Intel Science Talent Search, a science competition for high school seniors || 
|-id=130
| 30130 Jeandillman ||  || Jean Dillman, a mentor of finalist in the 2014 Intel Science Talent Search (STS), a science competition for high school seniors || 
|-id=136
| 30136 Bakerfranke ||  || Baker Franke, a mentor of finalist in the 2014 Intel Science Talent Search (STS), a science competition for high school seniors || 
|-id=140
| 30140 Robpergolizzi ||  || Robert Pergolizzi, a mentor of finalist in the 2014 Intel Science Talent Search, a science competition for high school seniors || 
|-id=141
| 30141 Nelvenzon ||  || Nel Venzon Jr., a mentor of finalist in the 2014 Intel Science Talent Search, a science competition for high school seniors || 
|-id=142
| 30142 Debfrazier ||  || Debbie Frazier, a mentor of finalist in the 2014 Intel Science Talent Search, a science competition for high school seniors || 
|-id=144
| 30144 Minubasu ||  || Minu Basu, a mentor of finalist in the 2014 Intel Science Talent Search (STS), a science competition for high school seniors || 
|-id=146
| 30146 Decandia ||  || Maria DeCandia, a mentor of finalist in the 2014 Intel Science Talent Search, a science competition for high school seniors || 
|-id=147
| 30147 Amyhammer ||  || Amy Hammer, a mentor of finalist in the 2014 Intel Science Talent Search (STS), a science competition for high school seniors || 
|-id=149
| 30149 Kellyriedell ||  || Kelly Riedell, a mentor of finalist in the 2014 Intel Science Talent Search, a science competition for high school seniors || 
|-id=150
| 30150 Laseminara ||  || Laurie Seminara, a mentor of finalist in the 2014 Intel Science Talent Search, a science competition for high school seniors || 
|-id=151
| 30151 Susanoffner ||  || Susan Offner, a mentor of finalist in the 2014 Intel Science Talent Search (STS), a science competition for high school seniors || 
|-id=152
| 30152 Reneefallon ||  || Renee Fallon, a mentor of finalist in the 2014 Intel Science Talent Search (STS), a science competition for high school seniors || 
|-id=153
| 30153 Ostrander ||  || Peter Ostrander, a mentor of finalist in the 2014 Intel Science Talent Search, a science competition for high school seniors || 
|-id=154
| 30154 Christichil ||  || Christi Chilton, a mentor of finalist in the 2014 Intel Science Talent Search, a science competition for high school seniors || 
|-id=155
| 30155 Warmuth ||  || Audrey Warmuth, a mentor of finalist in the 2013 Intel Science Talent Search, a science competition for high school seniors || 
|-id=157
| 30157 Robertspira ||  || Robert Spira, a mentor of finalist in the 2004 Intel Science Talent Search (STS), a science competition for high school seniors || 
|-id=158
| 30158 Mabdulla ||  || Muhammad Ugur Oglu Abdulla (born 1999), a finalist in the 2014 Broadcom MASTERS, a math and science competition for middle school students, for his mathematics and computer science project || 
|-id=159
| 30159 Behari ||  || Nikhil Behari (born 2000), a finalist in the 2014 Broadcom MASTERS, a math and science competition for middle school students, for his mathematics and computer science project || 
|-id=160
| 30160 Danielbruce ||  || Daniel Sebastian Bruce (born 2000), a finalist in the 2014 Broadcom MASTERS, a math and science competition for middle school students, for his animal & plant sciences project || 
|-id=161
| 30161 Chrepta ||  || Benjamin Joseph Chrepta (born 1999), a finalist in the 2014 Broadcom MASTERS, a math and science competition for middle school students, for his mathematics and computer science project || 
|-id=162
| 30162 Courtney ||  || Joshua Michael Courtney (born 2001), a finalist in the 2014 Broadcom MASTERS, a math and science competition for middle school students, for his animal & plant sciences project || 
|-id=164
| 30164 Arnobdas ||  || Arnob Das (born 1999), a finalist in the 2014 Broadcom MASTERS, a math and science competition for middle school students, for his biochemistry, medicine, health science, and microbiology project || 
|-id=166
| 30166 Leodeng ||  || Leo Z. Deng (born 1999), a finalist in the 2014 Broadcom MASTERS, a math and science competition for middle school students, for his environmental sciences project || 
|-id=167
| 30167 Caredmonds ||  || Caroline S Edmonds (born 2001), a finalist in the 2014 Broadcom MASTERS, a math and science competition for middle school students, for her animal & plant sciences project || 
|-id=168
| 30168 Linusfreyer ||  || Linus Alexander Freyer (born 2001), a finalist in the 2014 Broadcom MASTERS, a math and science competition for middle school students, for his biochemistry, medicine, health science, and microbiology project || 
|-id=169
| 30169 Raghavganesh ||  || Raghav Ganesh (born 2002), a finalist in the 2014 Broadcom MASTERS, a math and science competition for middle school students, for his engineering project || 
|-id=170
| 30170 Makaylaruth ||  || Makayla Ruth Gates (born 2001), a finalist in the 2014 Broadcom MASTERS, a math and science competition for middle school students, for her physical sciences project || 
|-id=172
| 30172 Giedraitis ||  || Alden Shea Giedraitis (born 1999), a finalist in the 2014 Broadcom MASTERS, a math and science competition for middle school students, for his engineering project || 
|-id=173
| 30173 Greenwood ||  || Floyd S. Greenwood (born 2001), a finalist in the 2014 Broadcom MASTERS, a math and science competition for middle school students, for his biochemistry, medicine, health science, and microbiology project || 
|-id=174
| 30174 Hollyjackson ||  || Holly Marie Jackson (born 2000), a finalist in the 2014 Broadcom MASTERS, a math and science competition for middle school students, for her physical sciences project. || 
|-id=175
| 30175 Adityajain ||  || Aditya Jain (born 2000), a finalist in the 2014 Broadcom MASTERS, a math and science competition for middle school students, for his biochemistry, medicine, health science, and microbiology project || 
|-id=176
| 30176 Gelseyjaymes ||  || Gelsey Elise Jaymes (born 2002), a finalist in the 2014 Broadcom MASTERS, a math and science competition for middle school students, for her environmental sciences project || 
|-id=177
| 30177 Khashayar ||  || Sahar A Khashayar (born 2000), a finalist in the 2014 Broadcom MASTERS, a math and science competition for middle school students, for her engineering project || 
|-id=179
| 30179 Movva ||  || Rajiv Movva (born 2000), a finalist in the 2014 Broadcom MASTERS, a math and science competition for middle school students, for his biochemistry, medicine, health science, and microbiology project || 
|-id=183
| 30183 Murali ||  || Chythanya Murali (born 2000), a finalist in the 2014 Broadcom MASTERS, a math and science competition for middle school students, for her environmental sciences project || 
|-id=184
| 30184 Okasinski ||  || Jonathan Guanghong Okasinski (born 2001), a finalist in the 2014 Broadcom MASTERS, a math and science competition for middle school students, for his physical sciences project || 
|-id=186
| 30186 Ostojic ||  || Annie Ostojic (born 2002), a finalist in the 2014 Broadcom MASTERS, a math and science competition for middle school students, for her mathematics and computer science project || 
|-id=187
| 30187 Jamesroney ||  || James Peter Roney (born 2000), a finalist in the 2014 Broadcom MASTERS, a math and science competition for middle school students, for his animal & plant sciences project || 
|-id=188
| 30188 Hafsasaeed ||  || Hafsa Naseem Saeed (born 2000), a finalist in the 2014 Broadcom MASTERS, a math and science competition for middle school students, for her environmental sciences project || 
|-id=190
| 30190 Alexshelby ||  || Alexander Lloyd Shelby (born 2000), a finalist in the 2014 Broadcom MASTERS, a math and science competition for middle school students, for his physical sciences project || 
|-id=191
| 30191 Sivakumar ||  || Aditya Diwakar Sivakumar (born 2000), a finalist in the 2014 Broadcom MASTERS, a math and science competition for middle school students, for his physical sciences project || 
|-id=192
| 30192 Talarterzian ||  || Talar Victoria-Grace Terzian (born 2001), a finalist in the 2014 Broadcom MASTERS, a math and science competition for middle school students, for her engineering project || 
|-id=193
| 30193 Annikaurban ||  || Annika Frances Urban (born 2001), a finalist in the 2014 Broadcom MASTERS, a math and science competition for middle school students, for her engineering project || 
|-id=194
| 30194 Liamyoung ||  || Liam Hayden Young (born 2000), a finalist in the 2014 Broadcom MASTERS, a math and science competition for middle school students, for his environmental sciences project || 
|-id=195
| 30195 Akdemir ||  || Nilgun Akdemir, a mentor of finalist in the 2014 Broadcom MASTERS, a math and science competition for middle school students || 
|-id=197
| 30197 Nickbadyrka ||  || Nick Badyrka, a mentor of finalist in the 2014 Broadcom MASTERS, a math and science competition for middle school students || 
|-id=199
| 30199 Ericbrown ||  || Eric Brown, a mentor of finalist in the 2014 Broadcom MASTERS, a math and science competition for middle school students || 
|-id=200
| 30200 Terryburch ||  || Terry Burch, a mentor of finalist in the 2014 Broadcom MASTERS, a math and science competition for middle school students || 
|}

30201–30300 

|-
| 30201 Caruana ||  || Chris Caruana, a mentor of finalist in the 2014 Broadcom MASTERS, a math and science competition for middle school students. || 
|-id=203
| 30203 Kimdavis ||  || Kim Davis, a mentor of finalist in the 2014 Broadcom MASTERS, a math and science competition for middle school students. || 
|-id=204
| 30204 Stevedoherty ||  || Steven Doherty, a mentor of finalist in the 2014 Broadcom MASTERS, a math and science competition for middle school students. || 
|-id=205
| 30205 Mistyevans ||  || Misty Evans, a mentor of finalist in the 2014 Broadcom MASTERS, a math and science competition for middle school students. || 
|-id=206
| 30206 Jasonfricker ||  || Jason Fricker, a mentor of finalist in the 2014 Broadcom MASTERS, a math and science competition for middle school students. || 
|-id=208
| 30208 Guigarcia ||  || Guillermo Garcia, a mentor of finalist in the 2014 Broadcom MASTERS, a math and science competition for middle school students. || 
|-id=209
| 30209 Garciaarriola ||  || Alfonso Garcia Arriola, a mentor of finalist in the 2014 Broadcom MASTERS, a math and science competition for middle school students. || 
|-id=211
| 30211 Sheilah ||  || Sheila Harrington, a mentor of finalist in the 2014 Broadcom MASTERS, a math and science competition for middle school students. || 
|-id=216
| 30216 Summerjohnson ||  || Summer Johnson, a mentor of finalist in the 2014 Broadcom MASTERS, a math and science competition for middle school students. || 
|-id=218
| 30218 Paulaladd ||  || Paula Ladd, a mentor of finalist in the 2014 Broadcom MASTERS, a math and science competition for middle school students. || 
|-id=221
| 30221 LeDonne ||  || Sarah LeDonne, a mentor of finalist in the 2014 Broadcom MASTERS, a math and science competition for middle school students. || 
|-id=222
| 30222 Malecki ||  || Eva Malecki, a mentor of finalist in the 2014 Broadcom MASTERS, a math and science competition for middle school students. || 
|-id=228
| 30228 Hushoucun ||  || Shoucun Hu (born 1985) is a professor at the Chinese Academy of Sciences who studies gravity and dynamics around asteroids. He is currently involved in proposing new Chinese space missions to small solar system bodies. || 
|-id=230
| 30230 Ralucarufu ||  || Raluca Rufu (born 1989) is a Postdoctoral Fellow at the Southwest Research Institute, whose graduate research at the Weizmann Institute explored lunar formation by modeling impacts and the accumulation of the ejecta. Her ongoing investigations include dynamical studies of satellites. || 
|-id=231
| 30231 Patorojo ||  || Patricio Rojo (born 1977) is a professor at the Departamento de Astronomia, Universidad de Chile whose work includes the atmospheric characterization of exoplanets and minor body surveys, as well as characterization of binary asteroids. || 
|-id=234
| 30234 Dudziński ||  || Grzegorz Dudziński (born 1989) is a postdoctoral researcher at the Astronomical Observatory of the Adam Mickiewicz University in Poznań, Poland. He is studying physical properties of asteroids and contributing to development of new asteroid shape modeling methods. || 
|-id=235
| 30235 Kimmiller ||  || Kim Miller, a mentor of finalist in the 2014 Broadcom MASTERS, a math and science competition for middle school students. || 
|-id=240
| 30240 Morgensen ||  || Kristen Morgensen, a mentor of finalist in the 2014 Broadcom MASTERS, a math and science competition for middle school students. || 
|-id=241
| 30241 Donnamower ||  || Donna Mower, a mentor of finalist in the 2014 Broadcom MASTERS, a math and science competition for middle school students. || 
|-id=242
| 30242 Naymark ||  || Alissa Naymark, a mentor of finalist in the 2014 Broadcom MASTERS, a math and science competition for middle school students. || 
|-id=244
| 30244 Linhpham ||  || Linh Pham, a mentor of finalist in the 2014 Broadcom MASTERS, a math and science competition for middle school students. || 
|-id=245
| 30245 Paigesmith ||  || Paige Smith, a mentor of finalist in the 2014 Broadcom MASTERS, a math and science competition for middle school students. || 
|-id=248
| 30248 Kimstinson ||  || Kim Stinson, a mentor of finalist in the 2014 Broadcom MASTERS, a math and science competition for middle school students. || 
|-id=249
| 30249 Zamora ||  || Suzanne Zamora, a mentor of finalist in the 2014 Broadcom MASTERS, a math and science competition for middle school students. || 
|-id=251
| 30251 Ashkin ||  || Emily Lorin Ashkin (born 1997), a finalist in the 2015 Intel STS, and was awarded second place in the 2014 Intel ISEF, for her medicine and health project. || 
|-id=252
| 30252 Textorisová ||  || Izabela Textorisová, Slovak botanist †  || 
|-id=253
| 30253 Vítek ||  || Antonín Vítek, Czech biochemist, computer specialist, author, and media space popularizer || 
|-id=257
| 30257 Leejanel ||  || Jihyeon (Janel) Lee (born 1997), a finalist in the 2015 Intel STS, and was awarded second place in the 2014 Intel ISEF, for her computer science project. || 
|-id=259
| 30259 Catherineli ||  || Catherine J. Li (born 1996), a finalist in the 2015 Intel STS, and was awarded second place in the 2014 Intel ISEF, for her materials science project. || 
|-id=267
| 30267 Raghuvanshi ||  || Anika Raghuvanshi (born 1997), a finalist in the 2015 Intel STS, and was awarded second place in the 2014 Intel ISEF, for her engineering project. || 
|-id=268
| 30268 Jessezhang ||  || Jesse Zhang (born 1997), a finalist in the 2015 Intel STS, and was awarded second place in the 2014 Intel ISEF, for his earth and planetary science project.   || 
|-id=269
| 30269 Anandapadmanaban ||  || Eswar Anandapadmanaban (born 1997), a finalist in the 2015 Intel Science Talent Search (STS), a science competition for high school seniors, for his bioengineering project. || 
|-id=270
| 30270 Chemparathy ||  || Augustine George Chemparathy (born 1997), a finalist in the 2015 Intel Science Talent Search (STS), a science competition for high school seniors, for his plant science project. || 
|-id=271
| 30271 Brandoncui ||  || Brandon Bichemg Cui (born 1997), a finalist in the 2015 Intel Science Talent Search (STS), a science competition for high school seniors, for his engineering project. || 
|-id=272
| 30272 D'Mello ||  || Ryan D'Mello (born 1997), a finalist in the 2015 Intel Science Talent Search (STS), a science competition for high school seniors, for his mathematics project. || 
|-id=273
| 30273 Samepstein ||  || Samuel Epstein (born 1996), a finalist in the 2015 Intel Science Talent Search (STS), a science competition for high school seniors, for his animal sciences project. || 
|-id=275
| 30275 Eskow ||  || Nicole Eskow (born 1996), a finalist in the 2015 Intel Science Talent Search (STS), a science competition for high school seniors, for her medicine and health project. || 
|-id=276
| 30276 Noahgolowich ||  || Noah Golowich (born 1997), a finalist in the 2015 Intel Science Talent Search (STS), a science competition for high school seniors, for his mathematics project. || 
|-id=277
| 30277 Charlesgulian ||  || Charles Gulian (born 1997) is a finalist in the 2015 Intel Science Talent Search (STS), a science competition for high school seniors, for his space science project. He attends the Ossining High School, Ossining, New York || 
|-id=281
| 30281 Horstman ||  || Helen Horstman (born 1936), a long-time employee of Lowell Observatory, starting in 1964 and retiring in 2007. || 
|-id=282
| 30282 Jamessmith ||  || James A. Smith (born 1938) is a science educator in north Georgia. With his wife Shirley, he has inspired and mentored generations of astronomers growing up in the rural counties of the region and established one of the first planetariums in the area. || 
|-id=283
| 30283 Shirleysmith ||  || Shirley R. Smith (born 1939) is a U.S. science educator in north Georgia. Together with her husband Jim and through her love of the night sky, she has encouraged and guided generations of young people into astronomy careers. || 
|-id=295
| 30295 Anvitagupta ||  || Anvita Gupta (born 1997), a finalist in the 2015 Intel Science Talent Search (STS), a science competition for high school seniors, for her biochemistry project. || 
|-id=296
| 30296 Bricehuang ||  || Brice Huang (born 1997), a finalist in the 2015 Intel Science Talent Search (STS), a science competition for high school seniors, for his mathematics project. || 
|-id=298
| 30298 Somyakhare ||  || Somya Khare (born 1997), a finalist in the 2015 Intel Science Talent search (STS), a science competition for high school seniors, for her microbiology project. || 
|-id=299
| 30299 Shashkishore ||  || Shashwat Kishore (born 1996), a finalist in the 2015 Intel Science Talent search (STS), a science competition for high school seniors, for his mathematics project. || 
|}

30301–30400 

|-
| 30301 Kuditipudi ||  || Rohith Kuditipudi (born 1996), a finalist in the 2015 Intel Science Talent search (STS), a science competition for high school seniors, for his bioinformatics and genomics project. || 
|-id=302
| 30302 Kritilall ||  || Kriti Lall (born 1997), a finalist in the 2015 Intel Science Talent search (STS), a science competition for high school seniors, for his environmental science project. || 
|-id=304
| 30304 Denisvida ||  || Denis Vida (born 1992) is a Croatian meteor astronomer working at Western University in London, Ontario. His research focuses on optical meteor measurements and he has developed a novel low-cost meteor camera system now deployed as hundreds of cameras within the Global Meteor Network. || 
|-id=305
| 30305 Severi || 2000 JA || Francesco Severi, 19th–20th-century Italian mathematician, historian, educator and philosopher || 
|-id=306
| 30306 Frigyesriesz || 2000 JD || Frigyes Riesz, 19th–20th-century Hungarian mathematician, elder brother of Marcel Riesz †  || 
|-id=307
| 30307 Marcelriesz || 2000 JE || Marcel Riesz, 19th–20th-century Hungarian-born Swedish mathematician † \ || 
|-id=308
| 30308 Ienli ||  || Ien Li (born 1997), a finalist in the 2015 Intel Science Talent search (STS), a science competition for high school seniors, for her behavioral and social sciences project. || 
|-id=310
| 30310 Alexanderlin ||  || Alexander Lin (born 1997), a finalist in the 2015 Intel Science Talent search (STS), a science competition for high school seniors, for his computer science project. || 
|-id=312
| 30312 Lilyliu ||  || Lily Liu (born 1997), a finalist in the 2015 Intel Science Talent search (STS), a science competition for high school seniors, for her chemistry project. || 
|-id=314
| 30314 Yelenam ||  || Yelena Mandelshtam (born 1997), a finalist in the 2015 Intel Science Talent search (STS), a science competition for high school seniors, for her mathematics project. || 
|-id=316
| 30316 Scottmassa ||  || Scott Massa (born 1997), a finalist in the 2015 Intel Science Talent search (STS), a science competition for high school seniors, for his biochemistry project. || 
|-id=321
| 30321 McCleary ||  || Jennifer McCleary (born 1997), a finalist in the 2015 Intel Science Talent search (STS), a science competition for high school seniors, for her chemistry project. || 
|-id=323
| 30323 Anyam ||  || Anya Michaelson (born 1997), a finalist in the 2015 Intel Science Talent search (STS), a science competition for high school seniors, for her physics project. || 
|-id=324
| 30324 Pandya ||  || Dhaivat Nitin Pandya (born 1997), a finalist in the 2015 Intel Science Talent search (STS), a science competition for high school seniors, for his computer science project. || 
|-id=325
| 30325 Reesabpathak ||  || Reesab Pathak (born 1998), a finalist in the 2015 Intel Science Talent search (STS), a science competition for high school seniors, for his medicine and health project. || 
|-id=326
| 30326 Maxpine ||  || Max pine (born 1997), a finalist in the 2015 Intel Science Talent search (STS), a science competition for high school seniors, for his animal sciences project. || 
|-id=327
| 30327 Prembabu ||  || Saranesh Prembabu (born 1997), a finalist in the 2015 Intel Science Talent search (STS), a science competition for high school seniors, for his materials science project. || 
|-id=328
| 30328 Emilyspencer ||  || Emily Jane Spencer (born 1996), a finalist in the 2015 Intel Science Talent search (STS), a science competition for high school seniors, for her materials science project. || 
|-id=330
| 30330 Tiffanysun ||  || Tiffany Sun (born 1997), a finalist in the 2015 Intel Science Talent search (STS), a science competition for high school seniors, for her behavioral and social sciences project. || 
|-id=332
| 30332 Tanaytandon ||  || Tanay Tandon (born 1997), a finalist in the 2015 Intel Science Talent search (STS), a science competition for high school seniors, for his computer science project. || 
|-id=333
| 30333 Stevenwang ||  || Steven Wang (born 1997), a finalist in the 2015 Intel Science Talent search (STS), a science competition for high school seniors, for his bioinformatics and genomics project. || 
|-id=334
| 30334 Michaelwiner ||  || Michael Winer (born 1996), a finalist in the 2015 Intel Science Talent search (STS), a science competition for high school seniors, for his physics project. || 
|-id=336
| 30336 Zhangyizhen ||  || Yizhen Zhang (born 1997), a finalist in the 2015 Intel Science Talent search (STS), a science competition for high school seniors, for her animal sciences project. || 
|-id=337
| 30337 Crystalzheng ||  || Crystal Zheng (born 1997), a finalist in the 2015 Intel Science Talent search (STS), a science competition for high school seniors, for her biochemistry project. || 
|-id=347
| 30347 Pattyhunt ||  || Patricia Hunt, a mentor of finalist in the 2015 Intel Science Talent Search (STS), a science competition for high school seniors. || 
|-id=348
| 30348 Marizzabailey ||  || Marizza Bailey, a mentor of finalist in the 2015 Intel Science Talent Search (STS), a science competition for high school seniors. || 
|-id=350
| 30350 Beltecas ||  || Steven Beltecas, a mentor of finalist in the 2015 Intel Science Talent Search (STS), a science competition for high school seniors.  || 
|-id=353
| 30353 Carothers ||  || Patti Carothers, a mentor of finalist in the 2015 Intel Science Talent Search (STS), a science competition for high school seniors. || 
|-id=357
| 30357 Davisdon ||  || Don Davis, a mentor of finalist in the 2015 Intel Science Talent Search (STS), a science competition for high school seniors. || 
|-id=362
| 30362 Jenniferdean ||  || Jennifer Dean, a mentor of finalist in the 2015 Intel Science Talent Search (STS), a science competition for high school seniors. || 
|-id=363
| 30363 Dellasantina ||  || Nicole Della Santina, a mentor of finalist in the 2015 Intel Science Talent Search (STS), a science competition for high school seniors. || 
|-id=365
| 30365 Gregduran ||  || Gregory Duran, a mentor of finalist in the 2015 Intel Science Talent Search (STS), a science competition for high school seniors. || 
|-id=368
| 30368 Ericferrante ||  || Eric Ferrante, a mentor of finalist in the 2015 Intel Science Talent Search (STS), a science competition for high school seniors. || 
|-id=370
| 30370 Jongoetz ||  || Charles Jon Goetz III, a mentor of finalist in the 2015 Intel Science Talent Search (STS), a science competition for high school seniors. || 
|-id=371
| 30371 Johngorman ||  || John Gorman, a mentor of finalist in the 2015 Intel Science Talent Search (STS), a science competition for high school seniors. || 
|-id=372
| 30372 Halback ||  || Damon Halback, a mentor of finalist in the 2015 Intel Science Talent Search (STS), a science competition for high school seniors. || 
|-id=373
| 30373 Mattharley ||  || Matthew Harley, a mentor of finalist in the 2015 Intel Science Talent Search (STS), a science competition for high school seniors. || 
|-id=374
| 30374 Bobbiehinson ||  || Bobbie Hinson, a mentor of finalist in the 2015 Intel Science Talent Search (STS), a science competition for high school seniors. || 
|-id=375
| 30375 Kathuang ||  || Katherine Huang, a mentor of finalist in the 2015 Intel Science Talent Search (STS), a science competition for high school seniors. || 
|-id=379
| 30379 Molaro ||  || Jamie L. Molaro (born 1986) is a planetary scientist at the Planetary Science Institute who specializes in thermal fracturing of rocks on asteroids and other bodies in the solar system. || 
|-id=384
| 30384 Robertirelan ||  || Robert W. Irelan, a mentor of finalist in the 2015 Intel Science Talent Search (STS), a science competition for high school seniors. || 
|-id=386
| 30386 Philipjeffery ||  || Philip Jeffery, a mentor of finalist in the 2015 Intel Science Talent Search (STS), a science competition for high school seniors. || 
|-id=388
| 30388 Nicolejustice ||  || Nicole A. Justice, a mentor of finalist in the 2015 Intel Science Talent Search (STS), a science competition for high school seniors. || 
|-id=389
| 30389 Ledoux ||  || Veronica Ledoux, a mentor of finalist in the 2015 Intel Science Talent Search (STS), a science competition for high school seniors. || 
|-id=396
| 30396 Annleonard ||  || Ann C. Leonard, a mentor of finalist in the 2015 Intel Science Talent Search (STS), a science competition for high school seniors. || 
|}

30401–30500 

|-id=406
| 30406 Middleman ||  || Elaine Middleman, a mentor of finalist in the 2015 Intel Science Talent Search (STS), a science competition for high school seniors. || 
|-id=407
| 30407 Pantano ||  || Alessandra Pantano, a mentor of finalist in the 2015 Intel Science Talent Search (STS), a science competition for high school seniors. || 
|-id=409
| 30409 Piccirillo ||  || Angelo Piccirillo, a mentor of finalist in the 2015 Intel Science Talent Search (STS), a science competition for high school seniors. || 
|-id=414
| 30414 Pistacchi ||  || Mike Pistacchi, a mentor of finalist in the 2015 Intel Science Talent Search (STS), a science competition for high school seniors. || 
|-id=416
| 30416 Schacht ||  || Scott Schacht, a mentor of finalist in the 2015 Intel Science Talent Search (STS), a science competition for high school seniors. || 
|-id=417
| 30417 Staudt || 2000 LF || Karl Georg Christian von Staudt, 19th-century German mathematician || 
|-id=418
| 30418 Jakobsteiner || 2000 LG || Jakob Steiner, 19th-century Swiss-German mathematician || 
|-id=421
| 30421 Jameschafer ||  || James R. Schafer, a mentor of finalist in the 2015 Intel Science Talent Search (STS), a science competition for high school seniors. || 
|-id=425
| 30425 Silverman ||  || Emily Silverman, a mentor of finalist in the 2015 Intel Science Talent Search (STS), a science competition for high school seniors. || 
|-id=426
| 30426 Philtalbot ||  || Phil Talbot, a mentor of finalist in the 2015 Intel Science Talent Search (STS), a science competition for high school seniors. || 
|-id=430
| 30430 Robertoegel ||  || Robert Toegel, a mentor of finalist in the 2015 Intel Science Talent Search (STS), a science competition for high school seniors. || 
|-id=431
| 30431 Michaeltran ||  || Michael Tran, a mentor of finalist in the 2015 Intel Science Talent Search (STS), a science competition for high school seniors. || 
|-id=437
| 30437 Michtchenko ||  || Tatiana Michtchenko (born 1954) is a planetary scientist at the Instituto de Astronomia, Geofisica e Ciencias Ambientais of the University of Sao Paulo (Brazil) with important contributions on the dynamical evolution of the asteroid belt, in particular on the effect of non-linear secular resonances. || 
|-id=439
| 30439 Moe || 2000 MB || Moe Howard (Harry Moses Horwitz), 20th-century American comedian, the mop-haired leader of the slapstick comedy team of the Three Stooges || 
|-id=440
| 30440 Larry || 2000 MG || Larry Fine (Louis Feinberg), 20th-century American comedian, long time member of the Three Stooges (the one in the middle with a scared-porcupine hairstyle) || 
|-id=441
| 30441 Curly || 2000 MX || Curly Howard (Jerome Horwitz), 20th-century American comedian, one of the Three Stooges || 
|-id=443
| 30443 Stieltjes || 2000 NR || Thomas Jan Stieltjes, 19th-century Dutch physicist and mathematician †  || 
|-id=444
| 30444 Shemp ||  || Shemp Howard (Samuel Horwitz), 20th-century American comedian, one of the original vaudeville-era Three Stooges, appearing on film in 1946 to replace his ailing brother Curly || 
|-id=445
| 30445 Stirling ||  || James Stirling, 18th-century Scottish mathematician || 
|-id=448
| 30448 Yoshiomoriyama ||  || Yoshio Moriyama, Japan planetaria constructor || 
|-id=473
| 30473 Ethanbutson ||  || Ethan Butson (born 1995), awarded second place in the 2014 Intel Science Talent search (STS), a science competition for high school seniors, for his medicine and health sciences project. || 
|-id=487
| 30487 Dominikovacs ||  || Dominik Kovaks (born 1994), awarded second place in the 2014 Intel Science Talent search (STS), a science competition for high school seniors, for his materials and bioengineering team project. || 
|-id=488
| 30488 Steinlechner ||  || Thomas Gunther Steinlechner (born 1993), awarded second place in the 2014 Intel Science Talent search (STS), a science competition for high school seniors, for his materials and bioengineering team project. || 
|}

30501–30600 

|-id=509
| 30509 Yukitrippel ||  || Yuki Trippel (born 1994), awarded second place in the 2014 Intel Science Talent search (STS), a science competition for high school seniors, for his materials and bioengineering team project. || 
|-id=514
| 30514 Chiomento ||  || Gabriel Chiomento da Motta (born 1995), awarded second place in the 2014 Intel Science Talent search (STS), a science competition for high school seniors, for his materials and bioengineering team project.  || 
|-id=524
| 30524 Mandushev ||  || Georgi Mandushev (born 1962), an assistant research scientist at Lowell Observatory who developed the data analysis pipeline that was instrumental in making the TrES exoplanet discoveries. || 
|-id=525
| 30525 Lenbright ||  || Len Bright (born 1957), an observer/technical assistant at Lowell Observatory. || 
|-id=533
| 30533 Saeidzoonemat ||  || Saeid Zoonemat Kermani (born 1962), a software engineer at Lowell Observatory. || 
|-id=535
| 30535 Sarahgreenstreet ||  || Sarah Greenstreet (born 1985) is a researcher at the B612 Asteroid Institute who studies orbital dynamics of asteroids and comets as well as planetary impact rates. || 
|-id=536
| 30536 Erondón ||  || Eduardo Rondón (born 1980) is a planetary scientist presently working at the Observatorio Nacional in Rio de Janeiro (Brazil). He specializes in observational and theoretical studies of small Solar System bodies. || 
|-id=539
| 30539 Raissamuller ||  || Raissa Muller (born 1995), awarded second place in the 2014 Intel Science Talent search (STS), a science competition for high school seniors, for her materials and bioengineering team project. || 
|-id=558
| 30558 Jamesoconnor ||  || James O'Connor, Irish amateur astronomer || 
|-id=562
| 30562 Güttler ||  || Carsten Güttler (born 1980) is the project manager for the OSIRIS cameras on the Rosetta mission at the Max Planck Institute for Solar System Research (Göttingen, Germany). His research includes the physical properties of dust in comets analyzed through laboratory experiments. || 
|-id=564
| 30564 Olomouc ||  || Olomouc, an old city in Moravia, the Czech Republic || 
|-id=566
| 30566 Stokes ||  || Sir George Stokes, 1st Baronet, 19th-century Irish mathematician and physicist || 
|-id=593
| 30593 Dangovski ||  || Rumen Rumenov Dangovski (born 1995) was awarded second place in the 2014 Intel International Science and Engineering Fair for his mathematical sciences project. || 
|-id=596
| 30596 Amdeans ||  || Alexander Matthew Deans (born 1997) was awarded second place in the 2014 Intel International Science and Engineering Fair for his materials and bioengineering project. || 
|}

30601–30700 

|-id=698
| 30698 Hippokoon || 2299 T-3 || Hippokoon, mythological friend of king Rhesos of Thracia, awoken by Apollo as Odysseus and Diomedes were killing the Thracians (from the Iliad) || 
|}

30701–30800 

|-id=704
| 30704 Phegeus || 3250 T-3 || Phegeus, mythological oldest son of Dares (a priest of Hephaistos), fatally wounded by Diomedes during the Trojan War || 
|-id=705
| 30705 Idaios || 3365 T-3 || Idaios, mythological younger son of Dares (a priest of Hephaistos) and herald of king Priam, who tells him that Paris and Menelaos want to start a duel || 
|-id=708
| 30708 Echepolos || 4101 T-3 || Echepolos, first mythological hero of the great fight after the duel of Paris against Menelaos, killed by Antilochos || 
|-id=718
| 30718 Records ||  || Brenda Records, American departmental office manager for the Indiana University Astronomy Department, the discovery site. || 
|-id=719
| 30719 Isserstedt || 1963 RJ || Isserstedt is a part of Jena, situated high above the town and near the scene of the 1806 battle of Jena-Auerstedt. F. Börngen. || 
|-id=722
| 30722 Biblioran ||  || Bibliotheka (Rossijskoj) Akademii Nauk (RAN) (Библиотеку (Российской) Академии Наук, "Library of the Russian Academy of Sciences") † ‡  || 
|-id=724
| 30724 Peterburgtrista ||  || St. Petersburg tricentenary (2003) †  || 
|-id=725
| 30725 Klimov ||  || Andrej Andreevich Klimov (born 1922), is a choreographer and producer, People's artist of the USSR and Russia, State prize winner, patriarch of Russian dance, and the author of Principles of Russian Folk Dance || 
|-id=767
| 30767 Chriskraft ||  || Christopher C. Kraft, who oversaw rocket launches and the design of space modules from Mercury to Apollo, as well as creating Mission Control || 
|-id=773
| 30773 Schelde ||  || The Schelde river, in Gouy, France. || 
|-id=775
| 30775 Lattu || 1987 QX || Kristan Rosemary Lattu, American member (of Finnish extraction) of the JPL technical staff, space systems integration and operations specialist || 
|-id=778
| 30778 Döblin ||  || Alfred Döblin, 19th–20th-century German doctor and novelist, best known for Berlin Alexanderplatz and Babylonische Wanderung || 
|-id=779
| 30779 Sankt-Stephan ||  || Abbey Sankt-Stephan (Benediktinerkloster Sankt Stephan) in Augsburg, Germany, where the Benedictine monk Father Gregor (Bernhard Helms) is a physics-astronomy teacher, builder of his own observatory and of the school planetarium || 
|-id=785
| 30785 Greeley || 1988 PX || Ronald Greeley, American planetary geologist || 
|-id=786
| 30786 Karkoschka || 1988 QC || Erich Karkoschka, German-born American astronomer || 
|-id=788
| 30788 Angekauffmann ||  || Angelica Kauffman, 18th-century Swiss painter || 
|-id=797
| 30797 Chimborazo ||  || Chimborazo is a volcano in the occident range of the Andes and the highest mountain in Ecuador (6263 m). In 1891, the botanist von Humboldt searched the slopes of the mountain for plants and trees in order to compare them with the vegetation in other continents || 
|-id=798
| 30798 Graubünden ||  || Graubünden (a.k.a. Grisons, Grigioni, Grishun), largest canton of Switzerland and birthplace of Angelica Kauffman || 
|}

30801–30900 

|-id=821
| 30821 Chernetenko ||  || Yuliya Andreevna Chernetenko, Russian astronomer || 
|-id=826
| 30826 Coulomb ||  || Charles-Augustin de Coulomb, 18th-century French physicist, author of Sur l'électricité et le magnétisme || 
|-id=827
| 30827 Lautenschläger ||  || Manfred Lautenschläger, lawyer, entrepreneur and philanthropist  || 
|-id=828
| 30828 Bethe ||  || Hans Albrecht Bethe, 20th-century German-American physicist and Nobelist || 
|-id=829
| 30829 Wolfwacker ||  || Wolfgang Wacker, German astronomer who worked at the Heidelberg Max-Planck-Institut || 
|-id=830
| 30830 Jahn ||  || Friedrich Ludwig Jahn, 18th–19th-century German educator, writer and "father of gymnastics" || 
|-id=831
| 30831 Seignovert ||  || Benoît Seignovert (born 1990) earned his PhD from the University of Reims, France. His research focuses on Titan's surface and atmosphere. He developed and maintains the Cassini/VIMS data portal that hosts the complete dataset of spectral cubes of Saturn's icy moons observed during the Cassini mission. || 
|-id=832
| 30832 Urbaincreve ||  || Urbain Creve (1950–2011), a doctor of medicine at the Stuivenberg clinic in Antwerp and a good friend of the discoverer Eric Walter Elst || 
|-id=835
| 30835 Waterloo ||  || Waterloo, Belgium, site of the Battle of Waterloo. || 
|-id=836
| 30836 Schnittke ||  || Alfred Garriyevich Schnittke, 20th-century Russian composer, creator of "polystylism" || 
|-id=837
| 30837 Steinheil ||  || Carl August von Steinheil, 19th-century Swiss-German physicist and opticist || 
|-id=838
| 30838 Hitomiyamasaki ||  || Hitomi Yamasaki (born 1945), who sufferers from leprosy became interested in astronomy and exchanged letters with Japanese astronomer Tsutomu Seki, who co-discovered this minor planet as well as Comet Ikeya–Seki || 
|-id=840
| 30840 Jackalice ||  || Jack Newton, Canadian astrophotographer, and his wife Alice || 
|-id=844
| 30844 Hukeller || 1991 KE ||  (born 1943), a German professor of astronomy at the University of Stuttgart, director of the Carl-Zeiss-Planetarium Stuttgart and the Weizheim Observatory, as well as editor of the "Himmelsjahr", an astronomical almanac. || 
|-id=847
| 30847 Lampert ||  || Klaus Lampert, experienced amateur radio operator || 
|-id=850
| 30850 Vonsiemens ||  || Ernst Werner von Siemens, 19th-century German inventor and industrialist, inventor of the dynamo and founder of electrotechnology || 
|-id=851
| 30851 Reißfelder ||  || Günter Reißfelder, German physician and well-known expert on urology and ambulant surgery || 
|-id=852
| 30852 Debye ||  || Peter Joseph William Debye, 20th-century Dutch-born American physical chemist †  || 
|-id=857
| 30857 Parsec || 1991 YY || The first five digits of the parsec (in metres) || 
|-id=879
| 30879 Hiroshikanai || 1992 KF || Hiroshi Kanai, Japanese photographer, president of the Minox Club of Japan (1969–2005) || 
|-id=881
| 30881 Robertstevenson ||  || Robert Louis Stevenson (1850–1894) was a Scottish novelist, poet, essayist and travel writer. His 1879 publication Travels with a Donkey in the C ́evennes, recounted his 200 km trip on foot through the C ́evennes mountains. The road he followed has been named Chemin de Stevenson in his honor. || 
|-id=882
| 30882 Tomhenning ||  || Thomas Henning, managing director of the Heidelberg Max-Planck-Institute for Astronomy || 
|-id=883
| 30883 de Broglie ||  || Louis-Victor, 7th duc de Broglie, 20th-century French physicist and Nobelist || 
|-id=888
| 30888 Okitsumisaki ||  || Okitsumisaki in western Kōchi Prefecture, a small promontory jutting into the Pacific Ocean. || 
|}

30901–31000 

|-id=917
| 30917 Moehorgan ||  || Maureen "Moe" A. Horgan, American trombonist, conductor and teacher || 
|-id=928
| 30928 Jefferson ||  || Thomas Jefferson, the third president of the United States (1801–1809) || 
|-id=933
| 30933 Grillparzer ||  || Franz Grillparzer, 19th-century Austrian dramatic poet and playwright || 
|-id=934
| 30934 Bakerhansen || 1993 WH || The two American space enthusiasts Lonny Baker (born 1942), Global volunteer leader of the Planetary Society, and Todd Hansen (born 1950), author of Deep Sky and other Enthusiasms || 
|-id=935
| 30935 Davasobel ||  || Dava Sobel, American author || 
|-id=936
| 30936 Basra ||  || The city of Basra, located in south-eastern Iraq. It was founded in 636 CE at the historical location of Sumer, the first urban civilization in Mesopotamia. || 
|-id=937
| 30937 Bashkirtseff ||  || Marie Bashkirtseff (1858–1884), known for her impressionistic paintings Automne (1883) and La Réunion (1884), and especially for her diary, with a personal account of the struggle of women artists in a bourgeois society. || 
|-id=938
| 30938 Montmartre ||  || Montmartre, a large hill in Paris (France) || 
|-id=939
| 30939 Samaritaine ||  || La Samaritaine, a department store near the Pont Neuf, Paris. || 
|-id=942
| 30942 Helicaon ||  || Helicaon, a Trojan warrior, was the son of Antenor and the husband of Laodice, daughter of Priamos, king of Troy || 
|-id=955
| 30955 Weiser ||  || Thorolf Weiser, German palaeontologic geologist || 
|-id=963
| 30963 Mount Banzan ||  || Mount Banzan, Japan, at the foot of which is the Sendai Astronomical Observatory Ayashi Station (and where the New Sendai Astronomical Observatory will be in 2008) || 
|-id=991
| 30991 Minenze ||  || Min Enze, academician of the Chinese Academy of Sciences and the Chinese Academy of Engineering || 
|-id=000
| 31000 Rockchic || 1995 VV || Nickname of Gail Swanson, American singer-songwriter || 
|}

References 

030001-031000